The Sequence was an American female hip–hop trio from Columbia, South Carolina, who formed in 1979. The Sequence is noted as the first female hip hop trio signed to the Sugar Hill Records label in the late–1970s and early–1980s. The group consisted of Cheryl Cook, known as "Cheryl The Pearl", Gwendolyn Chisolm, known as "Blondy", and lead singer and rapper Angie Stone, known as Angie B, who were all high school friends.

Background
The trio was noticed when they bum rushed a performance by the Sugarhill Gang and sang for them and Sylvia Robinson backstage. Their most notable single was "Funk You Up" (1979), which was the first rap record released by a female group and the second single released by Sugar Hill Records.

Elements of "Funk You Up" were later used by Dr. Dre for his 1995 single "Keep Their Heads Ringin'". The group backed Spoonie Gee on the single "Monster Jam" (1980). Their single "Funky Sound (Tear the Roof Off)" (1981) was a remake of the single "Give Up the Funk (Tear the Roof off the Sucker)" (1976) by Parliament. The groups other charting single was "I Don't Need Your Love (Part One)" (1982). Angie Stone subsequently became a member of Vertical Hold and later a solo artist.

In September 2011, without Angie Stone, Cheryl Cook and Gwendolyn Chisolm released a single entitled "On Our Way to the Movies". "On Our Way to the Movies" contains a sample of The Staple Singers' song "Let's Do It Again". In December 2017, the group, represented by attorney Antavius Weems, filed a Federal Copyright Infringement claim against Bruno Mars, claiming that his hit song "Uptown Funk" makes use of their 1970s hit "Funk You Up".

Discography

Albums
 Sugarhill Presents the Sequence (1980), Sugar Hill
 The Sequence (1982), Sugar Hill – No. 51 Black Albums
 The Sequence Party (1983), Sugar Hill

Compilations
 Funky Sound (1995), P-Vine
 The Best of the Sequence (1996), Deep Beats
 Monster Jam: Back to Old School, Vol. 2 (2000), Sequel

Singles
 "Funk You Up" (1979), Sugar Hill – No. 15 Black Singles
 "Monster Jam" (1980), Sugar Hill – with Spoonie Gee
 "And You Know That" (1980), Sugar Hill
 "Funky Sound (Tear The Roof Off)" (1981), Sugar Hill – No. 39 Black Singles
 "Simon Says" (1982), Sugar Hill
 "I Don't Need Your Love (Part One)" (1982), Sugar Hill – No. 40 Black Singles
 "Here Comes the Bride" (1982), Sugar Hill
 "I Just Want To Know" (1983), Sugar Hill
 "Funk You Up '85" (1984), Sugar Hill
 "Control" (1985), Sugar Hill
 "Love Changes" (1982), Sugar Hill
 "On Our Way to the Movies" (2011), Distrophonix

References

African-American musical groups
American women rappers
African-American women rappers
Women hip hop groups
Musical groups from South Carolina
American musical trios
Southern hip hop groups
Musical groups from Columbia, South Carolina
Sugar Hill Records (hip hop label) artists